Edition (publisher) may refer to various publishing houses:

  (EAGLE), Leipzig, Germany
 Edition Axel Menges
 Edition Breitkopf, Leipzig, Germany
 Edition Durand, France
 Edition Güntersberg
 Edition Harri Deutsch, imprint by Europa-Lehrmittel
 Edition Leipzig, Leipzig, Germany
 , Leipzig, Germany
 Edition Peters, Leipzig, Germany
 Edition S, Denmark
 Edition Wandelweiser
 Edition Wilhelm Hansen

See also
 
 Edition (book)
 Edition (printmaking)
 Edition (disambiguation)